Lobsang Samten Taklha (1933 – 28 September 1985) was a Tibetan politician and one of three elder brothers of the 14th Dalai Lama. He was 53 years old and since 1978 had been director of the Tibetan Medical Institute in Dharamsala, India, where the Dalai Lama lives in exile.

Mr. Samten's career took him from a position as chamberlain to his brother in Lhasa, the Tibetan capital, to refuge in the United States, where he made Tibetan crafts and, for a few years, worked as a custodian at the Scotch Plains-Fanwood High School in northern New Jersey.

In 1954 Mr. Samten traveled with the Dalai Lama to Peking, where over the course of several months they met with the Chinese leaders Mao Zedong and Zhou Enlai to discuss the Chinese presence in Tibet.

He left Lhasa for India in 1958, a year before an abortive uprising by Tibetans against Chinese rule that resulted in the Dalai Lama's flight on horseback over the Himalayas to India. He returned to Tibet once, in 1979, as a member of the first Tibetan fact-finding delegation sent there.

Mr. Samten was born in Taktser, in northeastern Tibet, the same village where his brother, at the age of 4, was discovered by a council of elders and proclaimed the 14th Dalai Lama, the reincarnation of the religious and temporal leader of Tibet.

Mr. Samten, who served in the 1960's as his brother's representative in New Delhi and later in Geneva, died of hepatitis, according to Tenzin Tethong, the Dalai Lama's official representative in this country.

Samten died on 28 September 1985 at a hospital in New Delhi.

Bibliography 
 Heinrich Harrer, Seven Years in Tibet
 14th Dalai Lama, Freedom in Exile
 Michael Harris Goodman, The Last Dalai Lama, Claire Lumière, 1993, 
 Mary Craig, Kundun
 Namgyal Lhamo Taklha, Born in Lhasa, 2001, Snow Lion Publications, 

1933 births
 1985 deaths